Pappakudi (South) is a village in the Thirupuvanam taluk of Sivaganga district, Tamil Nadu, India.

Demographics 

As per the 2001 census, Pappakudi (South) had a total population of 4857 with 2437 males and 2420 females.

References 

Villages in Ariyalur district